Hannah "Annie" Elizabeth Rolinson Gale (December 29, 1876 – August 7, 1970) was a British-born Canadian politician who was one of the first women to hold an elected political position in Canada. She served as an Alderman on Calgary City Council 1918 to 1924.

Early life and personal life 
Gale, nicknamed Annie at an early age, was born in Netherton, West Midlands, England. The daughter of a merchant grocer and his wife, she attended an all-girls school. Upon her completion she passed the Oxford Entrance Examination. As a woman, however, she was not able to become a student at Oxford University. She began helping run the family business after her father died of pneumonia.

In 1901, at the age of 25, Annie married engineer William Gale. The couple and their two sons (born in 1902 and 1905) eventually left to join their extended family, who had emigrated to Canada  and eventually settled in Calgary, Alberta in 1912.

Career 
Gale took an active interest in her new home. She soon noticed the poor quality and high prices charged for vegetables. This she found was a result of grocers having contracts with BC producers so the cost of transportation was added to the price plus the long time in transit accounted for the poor quality. Gale joined the Consumers League, founded to contest wartime profiteering and the high cost of living, and helped establish a City Market (farmers market) where sellers cold sell local produce.

She also played a leading role in the Vacant Lots Garden Club whose motto was "make the waste places into fruitful gardens.

She noticed the poor quality of coal sold door to door, and the fact that the horses pulling the coal cart were abused. She set up a stall in the farmers market to sell good quality coal.

Hearing tales of isolated farm women having to give birth without proper medical attendance, she became secretary of the Free Hospital League, which was dedicated to "work for hospitals as free as the public school system." The organization, with support from the United Farmers of Alberta, pushed Alberta's Liberal government to initiate public hospitals.

She played a major role in promoting the women's suffrage movement in Canada and organized Calgary's Women's Ratepayers Association, the first of its kind in Canada. She accepted the group's invitation to run in the 1917 Calgary city  election. She was the first Calgary woman to run for political office.

Gale was elected to the Calgary City Council on December 10, 1917.

The following year Gale was elected as acting mayor by her fellow members on the city council. For the first time in the British Empire, a woman performed the duties of a mayor, when the elected mayor was unable to perform his duties.

She was re-elected to city council in December 1919 and again in December 1921.

In the 1921 Alberta provincial election, she ran as an Independent Labour candidate in Calgary provincial. Gale was unsuccessful, finishing 16th out of the 20 candidates running for the city's five seats.

Her strong advocacy for working families made her enemies and they contrived to force her husband to resign from his employment with the City Engineering Department in 1923. She felt she could not serve on city council after his resignation so did not run for re-election when her third term on council expired a few months later.

In 1924, she was elected as a public school trustee for the Calgary Board of Education. The following year she resigned when she and her family moved to Vancouver, British Columbia. They moved there in hopes the coastal climate would help her husband's declining health - he died in 1939.

Annie Gale resided in Vancouver until her death in 1970 at the age of 93.

Legacy 
The Canadian Magazine said of Gale, in a 1917 article: "She is exactly the type of woman who should be in public life--a feminine, gracious, magnetic personality without aggression or bombast; a woman with a charming platform manner which does not come off the instant she reaches the bottom step and stands on the floor of the hall; the type of woman of whom the West is justly proud."

Gale said: "I have always believed that the mission of women in political life was to clean up politics."

Feminist Nellie McClung paid tribute to Annie Gale: "Women haven't an easy time in public life and Mrs. Gale has played her part courageously and intelligently. Mrs. Gale could always be depended upon to take a sane, forward, dependable view. Her tact and charming personality have carried her through many difficulties. Women haven't an easy time in public life but they count the cost before they enter. Mrs. Gale has always upheld the standards of womanhood and we cherish the hope that she will come back to us again."

In 1983, a junior high school was named after her in the Calgary community of Whitehorn.

In 1985 Judith Lishman's book "Alderman Mrs. Annie Gale" was published by Sheila Graham, in Vancouver.

In 2016, a boardroom in the municipal building in Calgary was named after her.

References

External links
Hannah Gale biography, City of Calgary
Annie Gale Jr. High School
Women in Canadian History: Annie Gale
Annie Gale: Alberta Heritage
Photo of Annie Gale captain of the Calgary Ladies Cricket Club, in the 1922 season

1876 births
1970 deaths
Deaths from pneumonia in British Columbia
Canadian feminists
Calgary city councillors
Women municipal councillors in Canada
Women in Alberta politics
British emigrants to Canada